Several steamships have borne the name Selma:

SS Selma (1871) was a 1,172-ton cargo ship launched as the Elf on 19 August 1871, by William Doxford & Sons, Pallion, England. She was renamed several times, in 1900 Selma. She was wrecked on 31 March 1901, while carrying a cargo of phosphate.
SS Selma (1896) was a 3,480-ton cargo ship launched on 15 February 1896, by William Doxford & Sons, Pallion, England. Wrecked off Cape Frio on 17 September 1910.
SS Selma (1906) was a 1,629-ton cargo ship launched as the Cassiopeia on 2 November 1906, by Nylands Verksted in Oslo, Norway. Renamed Selma in 1915. Mined and sunk off North Foreland on 25 October 1915.
SS Selma (1919) was a 6,287-ton concrete-constructed tanker built for the US government and completed in January 1920, by Ley in Mobile, USA. Wrecked off Galveston on 20 January 1922.
SS Selma (1921) was a 1,746-ton cargo ship launched on 17 June 1921, by Howaldtswerke in Kiel, Germany. Renamed Rhön in 1924. Scuttled off Arendal, Norway on 8 September 1946.
SS Selma (1924) was a 1,377-ton cargo ship launched as the Hamlet on 30 September 1924 by Howaldtswerke in Kiel, Germany. Renamed Selma in 1927. Exploded and sank in Oslo, Norway, on 11 January 1944.
SS Selma (1937) was a 1,392-ton cargo ship launched on 23 September 1937 by Fredrikstad Mekaniske Verksted in Fredrikstad, Norway. Renamed four times, broken up in Brindisi, Italy, in May 1971

References

Ship names